Delta conoideum, the mason wasp, is a species of potter wasp in the subfamily Eumeninae of the family Vespidae.

Distribution
This species can be found in India, Nepal, the Philippines, Indonesia, Sri Lanka and Thailand.

Bibliography
Hingston, R. W. G., 1926: The Mason wasp Eumenes conica, Part I. Architecture. Journal of the Bombay Natural History Society, 31: 241–247.

References

Potter wasps
Insects described in 1790
Taxa named by Johann Friedrich Gmelin